The Essential Black Art was an art exhibition held at the Chisenhale Gallery in 1988, curated by Rasheed Araeen. The exhibition contained the work of nine artists: Araeen, Zarina Bhimji, Sutapa Biswas, Sonia Boyce, Eddie Chambers, Alan de Souza, Mona Hatoum, Gavin Jantjes and Keith Piper. It provided a foretaste of Araeem's larger exhibition of the following year, The Other Story.

The exhibition catalogue contained several essays, including a paper which Araeen had given to the 1982 First National Black Art Convention. Araeen argued against identifying 'Black Art' as "whatever is produced by black artists", or seeing it as exemplifying "Asian/African traditions". Rather, Black Art was a "specific contemporary art practice that has emerged directly from the struggle of Asian, African and the Caribbean people (i.e. black people) against racism".

References

External links
 Essential Black Art – Chisenhale Gallery

1988 in art
Art exhibitions in London
Black British culture in London
Black British history